Elizabeth Froomes Christie (3 August 1904 – 9 March 1983) was a New Zealand painter.

Career
Born in Wellington on 3 August 1904, Christie trained at the Elam School of Fine Art at Auckland University College. She taught art at Takapuna Grammar School between 1935 and 1940.

During World War II she was a driver in the New Zealand Women's Auxiliary Army Corps and her paintings were included in the 1944 Artists in Uniform exhibition.

Although Christie did paint some landscapes in oils, she preferred to break with her contemporaries and depict vibrant social scenes, specifically set in Auckland. Works include: Geddes' Stable Yard and Tobacco Queue, Karangahape Rd, Auckland.

During her career she was represented by the Auckland Art Gallery.

Exhibitions
Christie exhibited with the Auckland Society of Arts (of which she was a member from 1933) throughout the 1950s, exhibiting alongside A. Lois White, May Smith, Helen Brown, and Frances Hunt.

She also exhibited with the New Zealand Academy of Fine Arts and the Rutland Group, an organisation formed by students from the Elam School of Fine Art.

Death
Christie died in Auckland on 9 March 1983, and her body was cremated at Purewa Crematorium.

References

Further reading 
Artist files for Christie are held at:
 Angela Morton Collection, Takapuna Library
 E. H. McCormick Research Library, Auckland Art Gallery Toi o Tāmaki
 Te Aka Matua Research Library, Museum of New Zealand Te Papa Tongarewa
Also see:
Concise Dictionary of New Zealand Artists McGahey, Kate (2000) Gilt Edge

1904 births
1983 deaths
People from Wellington City
Elam Art School alumni
New Zealand painters
New Zealand women painters
New Zealand military personnel of World War II
People associated with the Rutland Group
University of Auckland alumni
People associated with the Auckland Society of Arts